Mairi Ioannidou (born 25 April 1952) is a Greek former swimmer. She competed in two events at the 1972 Summer Olympics.

References

1952 births
Living people
Greek female swimmers
Olympic swimmers of Greece
Swimmers at the 1972 Summer Olympics
Place of birth missing (living people)